Nicole Rottmann (born 28 June 1989) is an Austrian former professional tennis player.

She won two singles titles and 13 doubles titles on the ITF Circuit. On 23 July 2012, she reached her best singles ranking of world No. 307. On 29 October 2012, she peaked at No. 185 in the WTA doubles rankings.

Rottmann has a 2–1 win–loss record playing for Austria Fed Cup team.

ITF finals

Singles: 6 (2–4)

Doubles: 21 (13–8)

External links
 
 
 

1989 births
Living people
People from Leibnitz District
Austrian female tennis players
Sportspeople from Styria
20th-century Austrian women
21st-century Austrian women